Vaik or VAIK may refer to:

 Vayk, a town in Armenia
 Västerstrands AIK, a bandy club in Sweden